Acrobasis dulcella is a species of snout moth in the genus Acrobasis. It was described by Zeller in 1848. It is found in most of Europe, except the north.

References

Moths described in 1848
Acrobasis
Moths of Europe